Darya Dmitrievna Sagalova (born December 14, 1985) is a Russian film and stage actress, and choreographer.

Career 
Sagalova has appeared in theatrical productions and films since 2003. She is best known for her role as Sveta Bukina from the TV series Happy Together - an adaptation of the American TV series Married... with Children.

Personal life 
On January 21, 2011, Sagalova married police officer Konstantin Maslennikov. They have three children.

In February 2011, it became known that the couple were expecting their first child, who was born on July 1, 2011. Their child was named Elizaveta. Sagalova gave birth again on July 31, 2015, to a girl named Stefania. On April 1, 2019, Sagalova gave birth to a third child - a boy whose name is unknown.

Filmography

References

External links 
 Official website
 

1985 births
Living people
Russian film actresses
Russian television actresses
Russian stage actresses
21st-century Russian actresses
Russian choreographers